The 1963 World Amateur Snooker Championship was the first edition of the championship that later became known as the IBSF World Snooker Championship. It was played from 27 December 1963 to 4 January 1964 at the Great Eastern Hotel in Calcutta, India, as a round-robin. Five players participated. Gary Owen won all four of his matches and took the title, with Frank Harris finishing in second place. Owen compiled the highest  of the event, 71.

Final standings

Match results

References

Snooker amateur tournaments
1963 in snooker
Snooker competitions in India
1963 in Indian sport
1964 in Indian sport
International sports competitions hosted by India